Ton Scherpenzeel (born 6 August 1952) is a Dutch keyboardist, composer, lyricist, and founding member of progressive rock band Kayak, together with Pim Koopman and Max Werner whom he met whilst at the Hilversum Muziek Lyceum (Hilversum College of Music). Scherpenzeel is the only Kayak member who has played on every Kayak album. Apart from composing the music, writing lyrics, and playing keyboards, he also plays accordion, occasional bass guitar (for instance on the entire Nostradamus album) and double bass. He also provides backing vocals and sings lead vocals on the song "Love's Aglow" on the original Merlin album.   In 2021, Kayak released their 18th studio album, 'Out of This World'.  Ton announced Nov/2021, that Kayak will embark on their 'Farewell Tour' (Spring/2022) throughout countries: The Netherlands, England, Germany, Belgium, Denmark, Sweden and Norway.  This will take place during the 50-year anniversary of the band. He did not rule out the possibility of occasional reunion performances.   Scherpenzeel has a notable fear of flying, that has limited his touring to the European continent..  Subsequent to Kayak, Scherpenzeel was also occasional keyboardist of Camel, a British Progressive Rock band. Ton was the keyboardist on several Camel albums: Stationary Traveller (1984), Pressure Points: Live in Concert (1984), Dust and Dreams (1991), Rajaz (1999)  and he performed live on Camel's 2003 Farewell Tour.  He also played several years with Earth and Fire. 

In addition to his association with Progressive rock bands, Ton Scherpenzeel has made a name for himself in the theater and film scene in the Netherlands as composer/producer of multiple musical productions.  In 1980, Scherpenzeel wrote the score for the Dutch movie Spetters, featuring Rutger Hauer.  From 1990 - 2012 he composed the musical score for more than 50 musicals for JEUGDTHEATER HOFPLEIN,  including 'Bolle Boos', 'Kruimeltje', 'Robin Hood'.  In addition several musical scores for the theater OPUS ONE, including 'Peter Pan', 'Jungle Book', 'Alice in Wonderland', and more.  In 2005, Jeugdtheater Hofplein, Rotterdam celebrated 20-year anniversary. The performance was attended by Queen Beatrix of the Netherlands, who met with the actors, musicians and composer (Scherpenzeel-photo) after the performance.  Since 1984 till present, Scherpenzeel is credited with composing almost all music behind songs of Dutch comedian Youp van 't Hek. Ton is scheduled to perform with Youp van 't Hek in many live theater shows for De Laatste Ronde tour, 2022 through 2024.

Ton's first solo album (1978) was an adaptation of Le carnaval des animaux by French classical music composer Camille Saint-Saëns. His second solo album, Heart of the Universe (with singer Chris Rainbow), came in 1984 and is a combination of instrumental and vocal tracks. In 1991, Scherpenzeel released his third solo album Virgin Grounds, under the pseudonym Orion. In 1998 he played a synth solo on the song "Cosmic Fusion", from Ayreon's album Into the Electric Castle, a rock opera on which Edward Reekers, also of Kayak, played one of the main roles. In 2013 Scherpenzeel released his fourth solo CD, The Lion's Dream.

2021: VELVET ARMOUR, the fifth solo album from Ton Scherpenzeel, was released via Friendly Folk Records.an independent label located in Rotterdam, Netherlands. Ton said in an interview with Irish Music Magazine/ (Nov/2021) that he was dubious about releasing an album like Velvet Armour commercially, and had considered releasing demos for free. When he made that statement on social media he was approached by owner of Friendly  Folk Records, Kathy Keller, who said she would be interested in releasing the album on her folk label. Ton mentioned that he loved Keller's dedication and enthusiasm and he signed with her label. He also told journalist Sean Laffey during the interview, 'I know I am not your typical folk artist but there are strong similarities and connections to that style'. The eighteen-track album reflects the essence of the Medieval Renaissance era, with a blend of Baroque Folk and Prgressive Rock Ballads. The album also includes an old Kayak number, 'My Heart Never Changed', originally released on the album, Royal Bed Bouncer (1975).  The album artwork for VELVET ARMOUR was created by, Henk Philhelmon Bol.  VELVET ARMOUR features guest musicians from Dutch folk scene: Rens van der Zalm on fiddle, Annette Visser on flute (ex-Flairck); and on the classical side of  Velvet Armour: violinist Maria-Paula Majoor with the Matangi String Quartet. Backing vocals: Irene Linders; Lead vocals, music, lyrics, arrangement, production, and all remaining instruments were by Ton Scherpenzeel.    

2022: VELVET ARMOUR  was longlisted for Best Album; and the single (track 2), 'River To The Sea' was longlisted on the Celtcast Fantasy Awards, (a music competition for Folk genre music).

Discography

Solo
 Le carnaval des animaux (1978)
 Heart of the Universe (1984)
 Virgin Grounds (1991, under the pseudonym Orion)
 The Lion's Dream (2013)
 Velvet Armour (2021)

Studio albums with Kayak
 See See the Sun (1973)
 Kayak II (1974)
 Royal Bed Bouncer (1975)
 The Last Encore (1976)
 Starlight Dancer (1977)
 Phantom of the Night (1979)
 Periscope Life (1980)
 Merlin (1981)
 Eyewitness (1981) (live album)
 Close to the Fire (2000)
 Night Vision (2001)
 Merlin – Bard of the Unseen (2003)
 Nostradamus – The Fate of Man (2005) (double CD)
 Coming Up for Air (2008)
 Letters from Utopia (2009) (double CD)
 Anywhere but Here (2011)
 Cleopatra – The Crown of Isis (2014) (double CD)
 Seventeen (2018)
 Out Of This World (2021)

With Earth and Fire
 Phoenix (1989)

With Camel
 Stationary Traveller (1984) 
 Pressure Points (1984, live) 
 Dust and Dreams (1991) 
 Rajaz (album) (1999)

With others
 Into the Electric Castle (1998, with Ayreon)

References

External links
 Ton Scherpenzeel website
 Camel website 
 Kayak website 
 Earth & Fire website 
 Friendly Folk Records website 

1952 births
Living people
Dutch keyboardists
People from Hilversum
Camel (band) members
Earth and Fire members
Kayak (band) members
Progressive rock keyboardists